is a former member of the Japanese idol girl group SKE48. She joined SKE48 as a second-generation trainee in March 2009, before being promoted to Team KII. She was a member of SKE48 Team KII, and a former member of NMB48 Team BII.

AKB48 general elections 

At the AKB48 27th Single Senbatsu Election in 2012, Takayanagi ranked 24, which earned her a place again in the Undergirls.

At the AKB48 53rd Single Senbatsu Election in 2018, Takayanagi ranked 18, which earned her a place again in the Undergirls.

Personal life 
Takayanagi's nickname 'Churi' comes from the sound that her pet parakeets make. Takayanagi also has five parakeets named Papi, Pino, Pucho and Popo, Pyuaru.

Discography

SKE48

Singles

Sub-Unit Singles
 Koppu no Naka no Komorebi
 "Datte, Ame Janai?" / Transit Girls
 "Otanoshimi wa ashita kara" / Aichi Toyota Senbatsu

Albums
 Kono Hi no Chime o Wasurenai
 "Shikatte yo, Darling!" / Team KII
 "Heavy Rotation" / Team KII
 "Sunenagara, Ame..." / Selection 8

 Kakumei no Oka
 "Natsu yo, Isoge!"
 "Zero Base"
 "Horizon" / Aichi Toyota Senbatsu

NMB48

Singles

Albums
 Sekai no Chuushin wa Osaka ya ~Namba Jichiku~
 "Ibiza girl"
 "Kimi ni Yarareta" / Team BII
 "Peak"

AKB48

Singles

Albums
 Koko ni Ita Koto
 "Koko ni Ita Koto"

 1830m
 "Aozora yo Sabishikunai Ka?"

 Tsugi no Ashiato
 "JJ ni Karitamono"

 Koko ga Rhodes da, Koko de Tobe!
 "Ikitsuzukeru"

 Thumbnail
 "Hibiwareta Kagami"

Films
 Oretachi no Ashita (2014)
 Jōrei Tantei (2014)

TV dramas
 Mōsō Deka! (Tōkai Television Broadcasting, 2011)
 Majisuka Gakuen 3 (TV Tokyo, 2012)
 Kintoku Special (NHK, 2014), Misaki Tanba
 AKB Horror Night: Adrenaline's Night Ep.14 – Video Posted (2015, TV Asahi)
 AKB Love Night: Love Factory Ep.16 – Catch in the Dark (2016, TV Asahi) as Minami

References

External links
 SKE48 Official profile  
 Official website on Avex Music  
 Official blog 

1991 births
Living people
SKE48 members
Japanese women singers
Japanese idols
Musicians from Aichi Prefecture